Bundenthal is a municipality in Südwestpfalz district, in Rhineland-Palatinate, western Germany.

Notable people 
 Ludwig Kneiss (1830–1900), singer and stage actor

References

Municipalities in Rhineland-Palatinate
South Palatinate
Südwestpfalz
Palatinate (region)